The Concept of Nature in Marx is a 1962 book by the philosopher Alfred Schmidt. First published in English in 1971, it is a classic account of Karl Marx's ideas about nature.

Summary

The critic Terry Eagleton summarizes Schmidt as arguing that, according to Marx, "Human beings are part of Nature yet able to stand over against it; and this partial separation from Nature is itself part of their nature."

Reception
The Concept of Nature in Marx has been seen as a classic work. The philosopher Herbert Marcuse offers a discussion of the role of nature in Marxist philosophy informed by Schmidt's work in his Counterrevolution and Revolt (1972). The political scientist David McLellan describes The Concept of Nature in Marx as, "an important and well-documented consideration of the importance of Marx's materialism."

References

Bibliography
Books

 
 
 

1962 non-fiction books
1971 non-fiction books
20th-century German literature
Critical theory
Frankfurt School
German non-fiction books
Books about Karl Marx
Books about Marxism